Trautvetteria is a genus of flowering plants in the buttercup family. Today it is often considered a monotypic genus, containing only one species, Trautvetteria caroliniensis, which is known by the common names Carolina bugbane, false bugbane, and tassel-rue. A second species, T. japonica, is now generally considered a variety of this species. The genus is named for the botanist Ernst Rudolf von Trautvetter.

This plant is native to Asia and eastern and western North America. It grows in moist wooded areas and other habitat. It is a rhizomatous perennial herb producing an erect stem up to 1.5 meters in maximum height. The large leaf has a palmate blade up to 30 or 40 centimeters wide with deeply divided, pointed, toothed lobes. The blade is borne on a long, slender petiole which may measure up to 45 centimeters long. The leaf is green, darker on top and paler underneath. The inflorescence is a panicle with several clusters of flowers on branches. The flower has no petals and is mostly made up of many long, white stamens each up to a centimeter long. At the center is a spherical cluster of green pistils. This develops into a spherical cluster of green fruits.

The plant contains protoanemonin, which may cause blistering or skin irritation.

References

External links
Jepson Manual Treatment: var. occidentalis
Washington Burke Museum
Missouri Plants Photo Profile

Ranunculaceae
Monotypic Ranunculales genera